Mosaic of Aydıncık (also called Mosaic of Kelenderis) is a Medieval age floor mosaic in Mersin Province, Turkey.

Geography
It is slightly to the west of the ancient harbor in a place locally known as Hanyıkığı.

The mosaic
The mosaic was unearthed by Professor Levent Zoroğlu of Selçuk University and his team in 1992.

The dimensions of the floor mosaic is 12 x 3.2 square meters (40 x 11 square feet). On the mosaic, the medieval harbor, two vessels and a part of the city were depicted. A part of the mosaic has been decorated with geometric figures. Professor Zoroğlu estimates that the mosaic had been created in the fifth and sixth centuries, i.e., early Byzantine era.
 There is no human being or a tree. Probably the image displayed on the mosaic was a kind of city guide for the visitors.

In 2005 the mosaic was put under a displaycase.

References

History of Mersin Province
Tourist attractions in Mersin Province
Aydıncık District (Mersin)
Mosaics in Turkey
Byzantine mosaics